United States gubernatorial elections were held in three states.

In Mississippi and Kentucky, general elections took place on 2 November 1971.  In Louisiana, their general election took place on 1 February 1972 after the party primaries on 6 November 1971 and a Democratic primary runoff on 18 December 1971.  In Louisiana, this was the last gubernatorial election which didn't use the nonpartisan blanket primary system.

In Mississippi and Louisiana, there were no party changes (in both cases, from Democrat to Democrat).  In Kentucky, there was a Democratic gain.

In Kentucky, Louie B. Nunn wasn't allowed to run for a second term under the term limits rule at the time, a rule that was changed in 1992.

In Mississippi, John Bell Williams was also barred from a second term under the term limits rule at the time, a rule that was changed in the mid-1980s.

In Louisiana, John McKeithen had been allowed a second term due to a new rule enacted that allowed governors two consecutive terms, and thus was
allowed to run for a second term (see Louisiana gubernatorial election, 1967). 
Thus, when the 1971 race rolled around, he too was term-limited.

Election results
A bolded state name features an article about the specific election.

References

 
November 1971 events in the United States